Georges Gratiant, (6 January, 1907-20 June, 1992) was a lawyer and politician from Martinique. He was mayor of Le Lamentin from 1959 to 1989 and president of the General Council from 1946 to 1947.

Biography

Youth and early activism 
Georges Gratiant was born on 6 January, 1907 in the commune of Saint-Esprit in Martinique, part of a well-to-do family. After his secondary education at the Lycée Schœlcher where he obtained his baccalaureate, Georges Gratiant studied law in France. He obtained a law degree and was admitted to the bar in Fort-de-France as a lawyer. Sensitive to the poverty of his fellow Martinicians, Marxist ideas appealed to him; he became a communist activist.

He founded the "Common Front" group in the early 1930s with René Ménil, Victor Lamon and Thélus Léro.

1941-1943: Georges Gratiant participates with René Ménil, Aristide Maugée, Aimé and Suzanne Césaire in editing the journal , which worked “To affirm the uniqueness of the culture of the Caribbean and its African roots” and “to say no to the shadows”. The arrival of a large contingent from France to enforce the Vichy regime made the subordination of the new department clear; and its Chief of Information Services for Martinique, Lt de Vaisseau Bayle, also took a dim view of the journal, inderdicting it as “a revolutionary review that is racial and sectarian”. This was their response:

Post-war period 
1945: On Liberation, Georges Gratiant supported assimilation with France, a view common to communists of the time, and took an active part in making it succeed.

1946: Georges Gratiant is elected the first President of the General Council of the new Department of Martinique until 1947.

1948: During the "Affair of the Basse-Pointe 16", Georges Gratiant was one of the lawyers defending the sixteen farm workers charged with the murder of a white creole administrator on the Leyritz estate in Basse-Pointe. At the trial in Bordeaux in 1951, his plea contributed greatly to the acquittal of the farm workers.

On 21 and 22 September 1957: Georges Gratiant, René Ménil, Léopold Bissol and Victor Lamon founded the P.C.M. (Martinican Communist Party). The P.C.M's slogan was "autonomy for Martinique". On 14 February 1960, the P.C.M. adopted a new draft status for Martinique, proposing an autonomous territory federated to the French Republic. The powers of the territory would be exercised by a Legislative Assembly and a Council of Government.On the 24th March 1961, during the strike of the agricultural workers of Le Lamentin, gendarmes shot at the crowd, causing the death of three workers. At their funeral, Georges Gratiant gave the poetic speech "": "Whoever wants bread will get lead, in the name of the law, in the name of force, in the name of France, in the name of the force of the law that comes from France." This speech provoked the anger of the Minister of the Armed Forces, Pierre Messmer, who took Georges Gratiant to court. He was given a suspended sentence and fined, but appealed and finally won his case. The loss of life is memorialised on a plaque at rue Hardy de Saint-Omer near the place that it occurred, in Le Lamentin.

Georges Gratiant spent his life fighting against injustice through his work as a lawyer, often at his own risk. He was actively anti-colonial, notably during the O.J.A.M. affair and during the strike of 1974.

Retirement from politics 
1989: Georges Gratiant, after having been mayor of Le Lamentin for thirty years, the commune having become the second largest city in Martinique, announced that he would not stand for re-election and supports the candidacy of his first deputy Pierre Samot.

1992: After gradually withdrawing from politics, Georges Gratiant died on 20 June, 1992 at the age of 85.

Memorials 

In his honour, the Place d'Armes stadium in Le Lamentin, the second largest stadium in Martinique, was named the Georges Gratiant stadium in 1993, the year after his death.

An avenue in Le Lamentin is named after him, as is a street in Fort-de-France.

List of offices 

 1945 - 1956 : First Deputy Mayor of Fort-de-France
 1945 - 1961 : General Councillor of Fort-de-France
 1946 - 1947 : President of the General Council of Martinique
 1959 - 1989 : Mayor of Le Lamentin
 1970 - 1985 : General Councillor of the canton of Le Lamentin
 1983 - 1990 : Regional Councillor of Martinique
 1985 - 1988 : General Councillor of the canton of Le Lamentin-3-Est

See also 
 Georges Gratiant, un avocat dans le siècle. Georges Mauvois - K Editions 3 - December 2008.

References 

1907 births
1992 deaths
Martinican Communist Party politicians
Martiniquais lawyers
Martiniquais politicians
Martiniquais communists